General elections were held in Antigua and Barbuda on 9 March 1999. The elections were won by the governing Antigua Labour Party. Lester Bird was re-elected Prime Minister of Antigua and Barbuda. Voter turnout was 63.6%.

The elections were extremely close, with the UPP losing five seats by a narrow 554 votes in total, and had the elections been free and fair (the government controlled almost all newspapers as well as television and radio stations), the opposition could have won a majority. Opposition leader Baldwin Spencer criticised the conduct and fairness of the elections and began a hunger strike in protest to the flaws in the system. The government responded by establishing the independent Antigua & Barbuda Electoral Commission in 2001.

Results

References

External links 

 Election report from the Center for Strategic and International Studies

Elections in Antigua and Barbuda
Antigua
General election
March 1999 events in North America